Net Cafe (or Cheifet's Net Cafe, formerly The Internet Cafe) was a US television series documenting the internet boom of the late 1990s. It was broadcast from 1996 to 2002 and hosted by Stewart Cheifet, Jane Wither, and Andrew deVries. The show was effectively a spin-off of the long-running PBS series Computer Chronicles.

References

External links
 Net Cafe at archive.org

American non-fiction television series
1990s American television series
2000s American television series